Lobocarcinus is a genus of extinct marine crabs that lived in the Eocene through Pliocene, containing these species:
Lobocarcinus sismondai
Lobocarcinus lumacopius 
 Lobocarcinus pustulosus 
 Lobocarcinus paulinowurtemberbensis 
 Lobocarcinus indicus 
 Lobocarcinus aegypticus

References

Cancroidea
Prehistoric Malacostraca
Prehistoric crustacean genera
Neogene arthropods
Prehistoric life of Europe
Eocene genus first appearances
Pliocene genus extinctions